The Sherman–Denison metropolitan statistical area (MSA), as defined by the United States Census Bureau, is an area consisting of one county – Grayson – in North Texas, anchored by the cities of Sherman and Denison. As of the 2010 census, the MSA had a population of 120,877. The Sherman–Denison MSA is a component of the  Dallas-Ft. Worth combined statistical area, which covers a 19-county area and had an estimated population of 8,057,796  as of July 1, 2009. It is also a major part of the Texoma region with proximity to both Lake Texoma and the Red River.

Communities

Places with 20,000 to 40,000 people
Sherman (Principal city)
Denison (Principal city)

Places with 2,500 to 5,000 people
Whitesboro
Howe
Van Alstyne (partly in Collin County)

Places with 1,000 to 2,500 people
Pottsboro
Collinsville
Whitewright (partly in Fannin County)
Gunter 
Bells
Tom Bean

Places with fewer than 1,000 people
Southmayd
Tioga
Sadler
Knollwood
Dorchester

Unincorporated places
Ambrose 
Gordonville 
Luella

Geography

Major highways

 U.S. Highway 69
 U.S. Highway 75
 U.S. Highway 82
 U.S. Highway 377
 State Highway 5
 State Highway 11
 State Highway 56
 State Highway 91
 State Highway 160
 State Highway 289
 Spur 503

Demographics

As of the census of 2000, 110,595 people, 42,849 households, and 30,208 families were residing in the MSA.  The population density was 118 people per square mile (46/km2).  The racial makeup of the county was 87.20% White, 5.85% African American, 1.31% Native American, 0.57% Asian, 2.95% from other races, and 2.13% from two or more races.  About 6.80% of the population was Hispanic or Latino of any race. (see Grayson County, Texas)

Media

Magazine
 Grayson Magazine

Newspaper
 The Herald Democrat

Radio stations
  KLAK Adult Contemporary 97.5
  KMAD  Mad Rock 102.5
  KMKT  Katy Country 93.1
  KDOC  Doc FM  107.3

Television stations
 KTEN Channel 10 - (NBC)
 KTEN DT Channel 10.2 - (The CW Texoma)
 KTEN DT Channel 10.3 - (ABC)
 KXII Channel 12 - (CBS)QF
 KXII DT Channel 12.2 (My Texoma)
 KXII DT Channel 12.3 (Fox Texoma)

Higher education

Also, Southeastern Oklahoma State University (SOSU) in Durant is within a 30-minute drive from the area. SOSU is the closest Public university to the area.

Top employers

Infrastructure

Health care

Transportation

A public bus transit called 'Taps' serves the Sherman-Denison Metroplex as well as the North Texas Region and even extends into part of Oklahoma. The company is a regional transit agency that serves the Texoma region. Two major routes run through the Sherman-Denison metroplex, one known as the Viking route because it is funded by Grayson County College and the other is known as the Roo Route and is funded by Austin College. In addition to this both Sherman and Denison each are served by a 24-hour cab service.

Airports

Attractions

Lake Texoma

Lake Texoma is one of the largest reservoirs in the United States, the 12th largest US Army Corps of Engineers' (USACE) lake, and the largest in USACE Tulsa District. It is located at the confluence of the Red River and Washita Rivers. Lake Texoma is the most developed and most popular lake within the USACE Tulsa District, attracting approximately 6 million visitors a year.

Diverse recreational opportunities  include two wildlife refuges, two state parks, fifty four USACE-managed parks, twelve marinas, twenty-six resorts, hundreds of campgrounds and a variety of excellent golf courses. Power boating, sailing, personal watercraft, water skiing and wind surfing are all popular.  The lake has become a major sailing center based on its size, depth and miles of sailing shoreline.

During the spring break and Fourth of July holidays, many college students home for the holidays will gather in an area called "Fobb Bottom" on the Oklahoma side.

Lake Texoma is also home to the Lakefest Regatta, widely considered to be the first inland charity regatta in the United States. The event typically attracts up to 100 keelboats and more than 500 sailors each spring. Since its inception, Lakefest has raised more than $2 million in support of various children's charities in North Texas. The current beneficiary is the Make-A-Wish Foundation® of North Texas.

Former professional Funny Car race driver "Flash" Gordon Mineo organized many "Poker Run" events on Lake Texoma.

The lake was stocked with striped bass in the late 1960s, and has proven to be an excellent habitat for them. It is one of the seven U.S. inland lakes where the striped bass reproduce naturally, instead of being farmed and released into the waters. The "stripers" feed on large schools of shad, and often reach sizes of 12 to 20 pounds (5 to 9 kg), with a lake record of 35.12 lb (15.93 kg) caught April 25, 1984.  The town of Kingston, Oklahoma, celebrates the importance of striper fishing to the local area with the annual Kingston Striper Festival each September.

In 2004, a blue catfish was pulled from the lake that weighed 121.5 pounds (55.1 kg), temporarily setting a world weight record for rod-and-reel-caught catfish. The fish was moved to a freshwater aquarium in Athens, Texas. More commonly, catfish in Lake Texoma weigh between 5 and 70 pounds (2 to 30 kg).

Historically, Texas and Oklahoma have not had a reciprocal fishing license agreement, which has posed a problem for anglers. Recent boundary resolutions have given Oklahoma jurisdiction over most of the fishing in Lake Texoma.  An Oklahoma fishing license allows fishing most of the lake, up to within 400 yards (370 m) of Denison Dam.  To fish the entire lake, a Lake Texoma fishing license is also available.

Many campgrounds, both public and private exist along the shores of Lake Texoma.  Among these are Eisenhower State Park, named for President Dwight Eisenhower, who was born in nearby Denison, TX and Camp All Saints owned by the Episcopal Diocese of Dallas.

Dwight D. Eisenhower birthplace

President Dwight D. Eisenhower was born in Denison, Texas on October 14, 1890, the first United States President to be born in Texas. The Eisenhower Birthplace State Historic Site has been turned into a historical museum in Denison and is a very popular tourism site in the area.

Choctaw Casino Resort

The Choctaw Casino Resort is a casino and hotel complex located in Durant, Oklahoma roughly 20 minutes from Denison and 30 minutes from Sherman. The complex has  of gaming floor, over 4,200 slot machines, a total of 776 hotel rooms, and is owned and operated by the Choctaw Nation of Oklahoma. The resort has two casinos and two hotels within the complex. Choctaw Inn has 101 hotel rooms, and the newer Grand Tower has  of floor space, 330 rooms and suites, and is 12 floors tall. The $360 million resort is the flagship of the Choctaw Nation gaming industry.

See also
Texas census statistical areas

References

Metropolitan areas of Texas